ŽKK Ragusa PGM Dubrovnik is a Croatian women's basketball club from Dubrovnik. They were the runners-up in the 2015 Ružica Meglaj-Rimac Cup and the winners in the 2015 Women's Adriatic Friendly League.

External links
Profile at eurobasket.com

References

Ragusa Dubrovnik
Ragusa Dubrovnik